Sorrowing Old Man (At Eternity's Gate) is an oil painting by Vincent van Gogh that he made in 1890 in Saint-Rémy de Provence based on an early lithograph. The painting was completed in early May at a time when he was convalescing from a severe relapse in his health some two months before his death, which is generally accepted as a suicide.

In the 1970 catalogue raisonné, it was given the title Worn Out: At Eternity's Gate.

Lithograph
The lithograph was based on a pencil drawing Worn Out, one of a series of studies he made in 1882 of a pensioner and war veteran, Adrianus Jacobus Zuyderland, at a local almshouse in The Hague and itself a reworking of a drawing and watercolour he had made the previous year. The inspiration for Worn Out was  Hubert von Herkomer's Sunday at the Chelsea Hospital, an immensely popular print depicting an old war veteran slumped dead that went on to become an acclaimed painting at the Royal Academy, The Last Muster, that Van Gogh had seen in 1875 when in England. Van Gogh wrote of his drawing:

Van Gogh's first attempt at the lithograph followed just two days later. He wrote: 

Later, in a rare expression of his own religious feelings, he wrote expressly about this lithograph and two other drawings also posed by Zuyderland, of an old man reading a Bible and saying grace (below) respectively:

Seven impressions of the lithograph are known, of which one is annotated At Eternity's Gate. The same theme is taken up again in two later 1883 studies of a seated woman.

In 2021, a drawing in a private collection in the Netherlands since 1910 was authenticated as a preliminary study for the original pencil drawing Worn Out by the Van Gogh Museum and put on display. The Van Gogh Museum had previously been aware of the existence of the study for some time.

Commentary

Writing about At Eternity's Gate in 1998, the American theologian Kathleen Powers Erickson remarked:

Genesis

Vincent van Gogh suffered from some form of mental illness, acutely during the last two years of his life. The official diagnosis furnished by the hospital in Arles that Van Gogh was taken to on 24 December 1888, following the celebrated incident involving his ear, was "acute mania with generalised delirium". Dr. Félix Rey, a young intern at the hospital, also suggested "a kind of epilepsy" he characterised as mental epilepsy.

There is no agreement today over a modern diagnosis of Van Gogh's illness. Suggestions include epilepsy and bipolar disorder, possibly exacerbated by excessive absinthe drinking, heavy smoking and venereal disease. Symptoms were varied, but in their most severe manifestations they involved attacks of confusion and unconsciousness followed by periods of stupor and incoherence during which he was generally unable to paint, draw, or even to write letters. It was such an attack that first led him to being hospitalised at Arles, and following a later relapse, he had himself committed to the asylum at Saint-Rémy in May 1889, where he remained for the most part until May 1890.

On 22 February 1890, Van Gogh suffered his most severe relapse, an episode Jan Hulsker called the longest and saddest of his life, and one which lasted some nine weeks through to late April. During this time, he was only able to write to his brother Theo once, in March 1890, and then only briefly to say he was totally stupefied (totalement abruti) and unable to write. He did not write to Theo again until late April, but that letter makes it clear that he had been able to paint and draw a little during this time, despite his sadness and melancholy:  It is in these drawings and paintings that Hulsker sees unmistakable signs of his mental collapse, otherwise rare in his work.

It is not clear whether Sorrowing Old Man ('At Eternity's Gate') is one of the canvases referred to in his April letter. Hulsker remarks that it would have been remarkable for Van Gogh to have copied his lithograph so faithfully from memory. Nevertheless, the painting is clearly a return to the past, and both the 1970 catalogue raisonné and Hulsker cite the painting as fecit May 1890 at Saint-Rémy.

From the 1880s

References

Bibliography
 Erickson, Kathleen Powers. At Eternity's Gate: The Spiritual Vision of Vincent Van Gogh. William B. Eerdmans Publishing Co., 1998. 
 de la Faille, Jacob-Baart. The Works of Vincent Van Gogh: His Paintings and Drawings. Amsterdam: Meulenhoff, 1970. 
 Hulsker, Jan. The Complete Van Gogh. Oxford: Phaidon, 1980. 
 Naifeh, Steven; Smith, Gregory White. Van Gogh: The Life. Profile Books, 2011. 
 Pomerans, Arnold. The Letters of Vincent van Gogh. Penguin Classics, 2003.

External links

At Eternity's Gate
At Eternity's Gate
Collections of the Kröller-Müller Museum